Benicia High School is a public high school serving approximately 1,700 students, grades nine through twelve. It is part of the Benicia Unified School District. It is located in Benicia, California, in the North Bay sub-region of the San Francisco Bay Area.  Like most California high schools, it is an open-air facility.  The campus is adjacent to Mary Farmar Elementary School.

Activities and athletics
Benicia High School competes in the Diablo Athletic League (DAL). The Diablo Athletic League is Division I, Benicia competes in the Valley Division.

Theater
Throughout the year, the department puts on two dance shows and two plays, one of which is a musical.  In some years the students put on their own production. The department also funds an improvisational comedy team which performs shows on select Fridays and Saturdays throughout the school year.

Band
The band consists of five main groups: the marching band, the concert bands, the color guard, the jazz band, and the drumline. The bands and the color guard perform and compete regularly in the fall and spring, and there are a winter color guard and winter drumline. The band competes in the Northern California Band Association.

Marching Band - The marching band performed in the 2001 and 2005 Tournament of Roses Parades. 
Concert Bands - Benicia High School has two concert bands, a symphonic band and an audition-only wind ensemble. 
Drum Line - The Benicia High School Winter Drumline is an NCBA Open class marching percussion ensemble.

Notable alumni
Notable alumni of Benicia High School include:
 Robert Arneson (Class of 1948) – sculptor
 Willie Calhoun (Class of 2013) – MLB outfielder for the San Francisco Giants
 Austin Carr (Class of 2012) – NFL wide receiver for the New Orleans Saints
 Dionne Quan (Class of 1998) – voice actress for Rugrats, The Fairly Oddparents and Bratz (TV Series)
 Austin Scott (Class of 2011) – Alexander Hamilton in the national Broadway tour of Hamilton (musical)
 Freddie Stone (Class of 1965) – Known to high school classmates as Fred Stewart, he went on to become a guitarist in Sly and the Family Stone

References

Further reading

External links
 

High schools in Solano County, California
Benicia, California
Public high schools in California
1892 establishments in California